HD 7449 is a binary star system about  way. The primary star, HD 7449 A, is a main-sequence star belonging to the spectral class F9.5. It is younger than the Sun. The primary star is slightly depleted of heavy elements, having 80% of solar abundance.

Companion
The stellar companion HD 7449 B, belonging to spectral class M4.5, was discovered in 2015. A survey in 2017 has failed to find additional stars with masses above 0.35 in the system.

Planetary system

In 2011 one super-Jupiter-mass planet,  on a very eccentric orbit around HD 7449 A was discovered utilising the radial velocity method. A second, long-term radial velocity trend is present, and a second planet or brown dwarf has been proposed as the cause of this trend. However, in 2015 a low-mass stellar companion (HD 7449 B) was found, which is likely the cause of the long-term trend. The large eccentricity of the inner planet is likely caused by this stellar companion. In 2022, the inclination and true mass of HD 7449 Ab were measured via astrometry.

References

Cetus (constellation)
Binary stars
Planetary systems with one confirmed planet
Multi-star planetary systems
J01142933-0502504
005806
Durchmusterung objects
007449
F-type main-sequence stars
M-type main-sequence stars